

mep

mepa-mepo
mepacrine (INN)
mepartricin (INN)
mepenzolate bromide (INN)
Mepergan 
mephenesin (INN)
mephenoxalone (INN)
mephentermine (INN)
mephenytoin (INN)
Mephyton
mepindolol (INN)
mepiprazole (INN)
mepiroxol (INN)
mepitiostane (INN)
mepivacaine (INN)
mepixanox (INN)
mepolizumab (INN)

mepr-mepy
mepramidil (INN)
meprednisone (INN)
Mepriam
Mepro-Aspirin
meprobamate (INN)
Mepron
meproscillarin (INN)
Meprospan
meprotixol (INN)
meprylcaine (INN)
meptazinol (INN)
mepyramine (INN)

meq
mequidox (INN)
mequinol (INN)
mequitamium iodide (INN)
mequitazine (INN)

mer
merafloxacin (INN)
meralein sodium (INN)
meralluride (INN)
merbromin (INN)
mercaptamine (INN)
mercaptomerin (INN)
mercaptopurine (INN)
mercuderamide (INN)
mercumatilin sodium (INN)
mercurobutol (INN)
mercurophylline (INN)
Meretek UBT Kit (Meretek Diagnostics)
mergocriptine (INN)
meribendan (INN)
Meridia (Abbott Laboratories)
merimepodib (USAN)
merisoprol (197 Hg) (INN)
meropenem (INN)
Merrem I.V. (AstraZeneca)
mersalyl (INN)
mertiatide (INN)

mes
mesabolone (INN)
mesalazine (INN)
Mesantoin
meseclazone (INN)
mesna (INN)
Mesnex (Asta Medica)
mesocarb (INN)
mesoridazine (INN)
mespiperone (11 C) (INN)
mespirenone (INN)
mestanolone (INN)
mesterolone (INN)
Mestinon
mestranol (INN)
mesudipine (INN)
mesulergine (INN)
mesulfamide (INN)
mesulfen (INN)
mesuprine (INN)
mesuximide (INN)